Sliven Municipality is a municipality in the Sliven Province of Bulgaria.

Demography

At the 2011 census, the population of Sliven was 125,268. Most of the inhabitants were Bulgarians (70.65%) with a minority of Turks (3.35%) and Gypsies/Romani (9.7%). 14.88% of the population's ethnicity was unknown.

Villages
In addition to the capital town of Sliven, there are 44 villages in the municipality:

References

Municipalities in Sliven Province